Democratic Rally (in French: Rassemblement Démocratique) was a small political party in Senegal led by the CGT leader and former member of the National Assembly Abbas Gueye. On February 2- February 3, 1957 RD merged into the newly formed Senegalese Party of Socialist Action (PSAS).

Political parties in Senegal
French West Africa